The Copa Polla Gol 1982 was the 12th edition of the Chilean Cup tournament. The competition started on March 13, 1982 and concluded on June 10, 1982. Only first level teams took part in the tournament. Colo-Colo won the competition for their fourth time, winning the final liguilla. The points system in the first round awarded 2 points for a win, increased to 3 points if the team scored 4 or more goals. In the event of a tie, each team was awarded 1 point, but no points were awarded if the score was 0–0.

Calendar

Group Round

Group 1

Group 2

Group 3

Quarterfinals

|}

Final Liguilla

First matchday

Second matchday

Third matchday

Top goalscorers
 Luis Marcoleta (Magallanes) 8 goals,
 Severino Vasconcelos (Colo-Colo) 8 goals

See also
 1982 Campeonato Nacional

Sources

RSSSF

Chile
1982
Copa